Sonya Jaquez Lewis is an American politician serving as a member of the Colorado Senate from the 17th district. She is a member of the Democratic Party and resides in Lafayette, Colorado. Previously, she served in the Colorado House of Representatives, representing the 12th district in Boulder County.

Early life and education 
Jaquez Lewis was born in Charlotte, North Carolina. She is the oldest of five children of Georgia Jaquez Lewis and Robert Lewis.

Career 
Jaquez Lewis is a licensed pharmacist and former first pharmacy director of Colorado Medicaid, Colorado Access. She served for seven years on the Boulder County Board of Health. She worked as an adjunct professor at the Colorado School of Pharmacy and guest lecturer at the Denver College of Nursing.

In North Carolina, she founded the Durham County Women's Commission 6 and the NC LGBTQ Pride Marching Band. She served on the statewide Board of Directors of NC Pride Festival and was one of the national Co-Hosts for NGLTF's Creating Change conference in Durham in 1993, the first CC conference located in the South.

In 2008, Jaquez Lewis was elected statewide as the first out lesbian national delegate from Colorado to the Democratic National Convention. She has been a three-time national delegate to the Democratic National Convention from Colorado. She is the vice chair of the Colorado House of Representatives State, Veteran, and Military Affairs committee.

Lewis was elected in the general election on November 6, 2018, winning 74 percent of the vote.

References

Democratic Party members of the Colorado House of Representatives
Living people
21st-century American politicians
21st-century American women politicians
Women state legislators in Colorado
LGBT state legislators in Colorado
Lesbian politicians
1957 births
Hispanic and Latino American state legislators in Colorado
Hispanic and Latino American women in politics
People from Charlotte, North Carolina
Democratic Party Colorado state senators